Euthyneura is a genus of dance fly. Six species of Euthyneura occur in the United Kingdom. The known range of E. myrtilli extended to Ireland in counties Fermanagh and Antrim in 2007.

Species
E. abnormis Saigusa & Yang, 2003
E. aerea Frey, 1953
E. albipennis (Zetterstedt, 1842)  
E. aperta Melander, 1902
E. argyria Melander, 1928
E. bucinator Melander, 1902
E. crocata (Coquillett, 1900)
E. gyllenhali (Zetterstedt, 1838)  
E. halidayi Collin, 1926
E. inermis (Becker, 1910)
E. matura Melander, 1928
E. myricae Haliday in Walker, 1851
E. myrtilli Macquart, 1836
E. spinipes Melander, 1928
E. stigmata Saigusa & Yang, 2003

References 

Hybotidae
Asilomorph flies of Europe
Empidoidea genera
Taxa named by Pierre-Justin-Marie Macquart